Sudesh Kumar (born 10 March 1950) is an Indian former wrestler who competed in the 1968 Summer Olympics and in the 1972 Summer Olympics.

References

External links
 

1950 births
Living people
Olympic wrestlers of India
Wrestlers at the 1968 Summer Olympics
Wrestlers at the 1972 Summer Olympics
Indian male sport wrestlers
Commonwealth Games gold medallists for India
Commonwealth Games silver medallists for India
Wrestlers at the 1970 British Commonwealth Games
Wrestlers at the 1974 British Commonwealth Games
Wrestlers at the 1978 Commonwealth Games
Commonwealth Games medallists in wrestling
Wrestlers at the 1970 Asian Games
Wrestlers at the 1974 Asian Games
Asian Games competitors for India
Recipients of the Arjuna Award
20th-century Indian people
Medallists at the 1970 British Commonwealth Games
Medallists at the 1974 British Commonwealth Games
Medallists at the 1978 Commonwealth Games